The 1st World Cup races began in early January in West Germany and concluded in late March in the United States. Jean-Claude Killy of France dominated the men's competition, winning each of the three disciplines and the overall title.  Nancy Greene of Canada edged out Marielle Goitschel of France for the women's overall title, her first of two consecutive titles, defending successfully in 1968.

Killy's 12 race wins for the season (amazingly, out of only 17 races during the season) stood as the record for wins in a season by a skier (male or female) until Ingemar Stenmark won 13 races in 1978-79.

Calendar

Men

Women

Men 
For the overall title and in each discipline standings in 1967, the best three downhills, best three giant slaloms and best three slaloms count.

Overall 
see complete table

Downhill 
see complete table

Giant slalom 
see complete table

Slalom 
see complete table

Women

Overall 
see complete table

For the overall title in 1967, the best three downhills, best three giant slaloms and best three slaloms counted. 11 racers had a point deduction.  The championship was decided in the last race of the season.

Downhill 
see complete table

In Women's Downhill World Cup 1966/67 the best 3 results count. For the very first time there was a shared win, when Marielle Goitschel and Giustina Demetz tied at Sestriere.

Giant slalom 
see complete table

In Women's Giant Slalom World Cup 1966/67 the best 3 results count. Nancy Greene won four races. She won the cup with maximum points.

Slalom 
see complete table

In Women's Slalom World Cup 1966/67 the best 3 results count.

Nations Cup

Overall

Men 
French racers won 15 races out of 17 – Austrian races were only able to win the first and the last event.

Women

Medal table

References

External links 
FIS-ski.com – World Cup standings – 1967

 
FIS Alpine Ski World Cup
World Cup